Sir George Macartney should not be confused with his kinsman George Macartney, an earlier British statesman.

Sir George McCartney  (19 January 1867 –19 May 1945), generally recorded as Macartney, was the British consul-general in Kashgar at the end of the 19th century. He was succeeded by Percy T. Etherton. Macartney arrived in Xinjiang in 1890 as interpreter for the Younghusband expedition. He remained there until 1918. Macartney first proposed the Macartney-MacDonald Line as the boundary between China and India in Aksai Chin.

Macartney was born at Nanjing and was half-Chinese while his godfather was Chinese politician Li Hongzhang. His father, Halliday Macartney, was a member of the same family as  George Macartney, the 18th century British ambassador to China, and his mother was a near relative of Lar Wang, one of the leaders of the Taiping rebellion.

Macartney married Catherine Borland in 1898. In Kashgar his wife, Catherine, Lady Macartney, assisted the archaeologists who found the library at Dunhuang. The Macartneys had three children.

The Macartneys retired to Jersey in the Channel Islands, where they were trapped by the German occupation during World War II. Macartney died on Jersey, just a few days after the German surrender.

References

Bibliography

Lady Macartney, An English Lady in Chinese Turkestan. London: Ernest Benn, 1931.

1867 births
1945 deaths
British explorers
Knights Commander of the Order of the Indian Empire
Explorers of Central Asia
British people of Chinese descent
British consuls